Sir William Óg de Burgh (died 1270) was an Anglo-Irish noble and soldier who was the ancestor of the Earls of Clanricarde and the Mac William Iochtar (Burkes of County Mayo).

Career
William Óg was the third son of Richard Mor de Burgh, Lord of Connacht. He served with distinction in France with King Henry III (1245) and later in Scotland. He was involved in fierce feudal warfare in Ireland where he killed the Lord of Desmond. He was killed at the Battle of Áth an Chip or Athankip by the Ua Conchobair Kings of Connacht, in 1270.

Family
He was survived by at least one son, Sir William Liath de Burgh (d.1324), Custos or Warden of Ireland (who married Una, a daughter of the Mac Jordan of Connacht). 

William Óg was the ancestor of the Burke (de Burgh) Earls of Clanricarde and the Mac William Iochtar (Burkes of County Mayo).

Genealogy

 Walter de Burgh of Burgh Castle, Norfolk m. Alice
 William de Burgh (d. 1206) m. Daughter of Domnall Mór Ó Briain, King of Thomond
 Richard Mór / Óge de Burgh, 1st Lord of Connaught m. Egidia de Lacy, Lady of Connacht
 Sir Richard de Burgh (d.1248), 2nd Lord of Connaught
 Walter de Burgh, 1st Earl of Ulster (d. 1271)
 Richard Óg de Burgh, 2nd Earl of Ulster (1259–1326)
 John de Burgh m. Elizabeth de Clare
 William Donn de Burgh, 3rd Earl of Ulster (1312–33) m. Maud of Lancaster
 Elizabeth de Burgh, 4th Countess of Ulster (1332–63) m. Lionel of Antwerp, 1st Duke of Clarence
 Philippa Plantagenet, 5th Countess of Ulster (1355–82) m. Edmund Mortimer, 3rd Earl of March
 Roger Mortimer, 4th Earl of March, 6th Earl of Ulster (1374–98)
 Edmund Mortimer, 5th Earl of March, 7th Earl of Ulster (1391–1425)
 Anne Mortimer (1388–1411) m. Richard of Conisburgh, 3rd Earl of Cambridge
 Richard of York, 3rd Duke of York, 8th Earl of Ulster (1411–60)
 Edward IV (Edward, 4th Duke of York, 9th Earl of Ulster)
 House of York (Kings and Queens of England and Ireland)
 Edmond de Burgh
 Sir Richard Burke
 Walter Burke (d. 1432)
 Burkes of Castleconnell and Brittas (Clanwilliam)
 Uileag Carragh Burke
 Burkes of Cois tSiúire (Clanwilliam)
 Sir David Burke, 
 Burkes of Muskerryquirk (Clanwilliam)
 Elizabeth, Queen of Scotland m. Robert I of Scotland
 Theobald de Burgh
 William de Burgh
 Thomas de Burgh
 Egidia de Burgh
 William Óg de Burgh (d. 1270)
 William Liath de Burgh (d. 1324)
 Sir Walter Liath de Burgh, d. 1332
 Sir Edmond Albanach de Burgh (d. 1375),  1st Mac William Íochtar (Lower Mac William), (Mayo)
 Mac William Íochtars, Viscounts Mayo and Earls of Mayo
 John de Burgh (1350–98), Chancellor of the University of Cambridge
 Richard an Fhorbhair de Burgh
 Sir Ulick de Burgh (d. 1343/53), 1st Mac William Uachtar (Upper Mac William) or Clanricarde (Galway)
 Richard Óg Burke (d. 1387)
 Ulick an Fhiona Burke
 Clanricardes, Earls of Marquesses of Clanricarde
 Raymond de Burgh
 Walter Óge de Burgh
 Raymund de Burgh
 Ulick de Burgh of Umhall
 Alice de Burgh
 Margery de Burgh
 Matilda de Burgh
 Daughter de Burgh
 Hubert de Burgh, Bishop of Limerick (d. 1250)
 William de Burgh, Sheriff of Connacht 
 Hubert de Burgh, 1st Earl of Kent (d. 1243) m.
 John de Burgh
 Hubert de Burgh
 Hubert de Burgh
 Barons Burgh
 Geoffrey de Burgh, Bishop of Ely (d. 1228)
 Thomas de Burgh

References

Bibliography
 The History of Mayo, Hubert T. Knox. 1908.
 Burke:People and Places, Eamonn de Burca, Dublin, 1995.
 Lower Mac William and Viscounts of Mayo, 1332-1649, in A New History of Ireland IX, pp. 235–36, Oxford, 1984 (reprinted 2002).

Year of birth missing
1270 deaths
Irish lords
People from County Galway
People from County Mayo
13th-century Irish people
Irish soldiers
Irish military personnel killed in action
William Og